The 10th constituency of the Pas-de-Calais is a French legislative constituency in the Pas-de-Calais département.

Description

Pas-de-Calais' 10th constituency lies in the centre of the department centred on the coal mining areas surrounding Nœux-les-Mines.

The communist Maurice Andrieux represented the constituency between 1967 and 1981. The constituency returned Socialist Party representatives at every election from 1988 to 2012, and National Front/National Rally representatives since 2017.

Historical representatives

Election results

2022 

 
 
 
 
 
 
 
 
|-
| colspan="8" bgcolor="#E9E9E9"|
|-

2017

2012

 
 
 
 
|-
| colspan="8" bgcolor="#E9E9E9"|
|-

2007

 
 
 
 
 
 
 
 
|-
| colspan="8" bgcolor="#E9E9E9"|
|-

2002

 
 
 
 
 
|-
| colspan="8" bgcolor="#E9E9E9"|
|-

1997

 
 
 
 
 
 
 
 

 
 
 
 

* Withdrew before the 2nd round

References

Sources
 Official results of French elections from 1998: 

10